Hinowakigawa Dam is an earthfill dam located in Shiga prefecture in Japan. The dam is used for flood control. The catchment area of the dam is 22.4 km2. The dam impounds about 29  ha of land when full and can store 1388 thousand cubic meters of water. The construction of the dam was started on 1961 and completed in 1965.

References

Dams in Shiga Prefecture
1965 establishments in Japan